Compsoctena rustica is a moth in the Eriocottidae family. It was described by Strand in 1914. It is found in Cameroon.

References

Endemic fauna of Cameroon
Moths described in 1914
Compsoctena
Lepidoptera of Cameroon